Spartanburg Area Regional Transit Agency, commonly known as SPARTA, is the provider of mass transportation in Spartanburg County, South Carolina. Eight routes run from Monday through Saturday, providing rides for nearly 600,000 citizens per year.

Routes
Route 1: Westgate 
Route 2: Hillcrest
Route 3: North Church Street
Route 4: South Church Street 
Route 5: Spartanburg Tech
Route 6: South Liberty Street
Route 7: Crestview
Route 8: Dorman Centre

References

External links
 Spartanburg's Public Transit System

Spartanburg, South Carolina
Bus transportation in South Carolina